Pskov State University (Pskov SU) is a public university in the Pskov Region of Russia. It is one of the 33 flagship universities in Russia. Pskov SU was established in 2010 by several other educational institutions in the region.

History 
Pskov SU was formed on 14 October 2011 by the merger of Pskov State Pedagogical University (PSPU), Pskov State Polytechnic Institute, the Technical College of Construction in Velikiye Luki, Pskov College of Construction and Economics, and Pskov Industrial Technical school.

In April 2017, Pskov SU became one of the regional flagship universities.

Pskov State Pedagogical University

Russian Empire era 
PSPU started on September 1, 1874, with the opening of the Pskov Male Teachers' Training college.  It was the first educational institution in Pskov Oblast to train teachers at zemstvo schools.  In October 1909, a new secondary educational institution opened for training teachers for urban schools and primary schools of the Russian Ministry of National Education.

Soviet Union era 
In October 1919, the teacher's training college and teacher's institute were merged into the Institute of National Education (INE) to train teachers of primary and secondary schools and political education workers.  In 1923, INE was  transformed into a pedagogical college - a secondary educational institution to train teachers of primary schools and employees of preschool and political, educational institutions.   On May 7, 1932, the Pskov Pedagogical institute was opened.  For two years, the university and institute shared the same building and director, Nikolai Vladimirovich Falyutinsky.

In 1934, the Pskov Pedagogical Institute moved to a separate building and administration. The university was transformed into a two-year teachers’ institute for the training of teachers of seven-year schools was opened. The previous departments were transformed into faculties. The university had two faculties - physico-mathematical and natural sciences.  In 1935, the Soviet government added the name of Sergei Mironovich Kirov to the name of the Pskov Pedagogical Institute.

In 1936, the first classes graduated from the pedagogical and teaching institutes. There were 933 graduates in total before 1941.  On July 8, 1941, during the German invasion of the USSR, institute employees fled Pskov to Kirov.  The institutes suspended operations until the end of World War II.  By the end of the war, the facilities for the two institutes had been almost completely destroyed. In May 1945, the Soviet Government started rebuilding the institutes, starting with four faculties: physico-mathematical, natural sciences, history, and literature.  In 1952, the teacher's institute was disbanded.

In 1956, the institute inaugurated a five-year term of study and started to train multi-skilled teachers. In 1957, the Vyborg Pedagogical Institute in Vyborg, Russia, was merged into the Pskov Pedagogical Institute. The number of teachers increased by 100 people, and the number of students by more than 1,000.  On June 15, 1963, the faculty of foreign languages was established.

In 1970, the Pedagogical Institute in Velikiye Luki was merged into the Pskov Pedagogical Institute.  In 1977 a  Faculty of Primary Classes was established.  On August 10, 1982, the institute received the Order of the Badge of Honour from the Presidium of the Supreme Soviet of the USSR.

Russian Federation era 
In 1997, the Faculty of Technology and Entrepreneurship was established.   On March 22, the institute was rename Pskov State Pedagogical University (PSPU). In December 2007, PSPU was recognized by President Vladimir Putin "for achievements in scientific and pedagogical activities and a great contribution to the training of qualified specialists".

In 2011, PSPU was merged with the other schools to become Pskov SU.

Pskov State Polytechnic Institute 
Main article:  Pskov State Polytechnic Institute

Pskov State Polytechnic Institute was the first higher technical institution in the Pskov Oblast.  It was established in 1960 as a training and consulting post of the North-West Extramural Polytechnic Institute. On the 8th of July, it became a branch of Leningrad Polytechnic Institute. It was renamed the Pskov branch of Leningrad State Technical University in 1990. In 1994, the Pskov branch was renamed as Pskov Polytechnic Institute, a branch of what was now Saint Petersburg State Technical University.

IN 2004, the institute became a separate school until 2011, when it merged with other schools to become Pskov SU.

Technical School of Construction 
The school started in 1952 as the Sebezh School of Construction Masters in Sebezh, Russia.  That same year, the school started training builders, operators, and designers of buildings and structures.  In 1956, the school was transferred to Velikie Luki and renamed the Construction Technical School in Velikiye Luki.

From 1980 to 1994, the department Production of construction parts and reinforced concrete structures trained technicians for the construction industry.

Since 1989, the department Construction, Operation, and Repair of Roads and Airfields trained specialists in road design, construction, operation, and repair of roads.

In 1993, on the basis of the order of the Ministry of Agriculture and Food of the Russian Federation No. 707, the Technical School was renamed Construction College in Velikie Luki. Since 1994, the Management department trained managers for administrative, managerial, and entrepreneurial activities in various sectors of the construction industry. In 2005, a representative office of Pskov State Polytechnic Institute was opened at the college.

In 2011, the Technical School of Construction was merged into the new Pskov SU.

Pskov College of Construction and Economics 
On 15 June 1966, Pskov Construction Technical School started working on the basis of the order of the Ministry of Construction of the RSFSR No. 76 of 10.06.1966.

In 1991, the Technical School was transformed into the College of Construction and Economics by the order of the State Committee of the RSFSR on Architecture and Construction No. 59 of 26.11.1991.

Until 1989, the College recruited only two specialties: Construction and maintenance of buildings and structures with the qualification civil engineer; Planning in construction with the qualification planner technician. Until 1990 the college was the only vocational secondary educational institution in the North-West Region that trained planner technicians in the specialty Planning in Construction.

550 planners and 630 construction technicians were trained at the extramural courses only for construction trusts of house-building plants in Leningrad and Leningrad Region.

In 2011, the Pskov College of Construction and Economics was merged into the new Pskov SU.

Pskov Industrial Technical School 
Pskov Civil Engineering College of the Ministry of Housing and Civil Engineering of the RSFRS was organized on the basis of the Decree of the Council of Ministers of the USSR No. 57006 of 30 April 1946 and the Order of the Ministry of Higher Education of the USSR No. 24 of 15 May 1946. The first student enrolment was made on 1 September 1946.

On 31 March 1955, the Technical School of Civil Engineering was renamed into Pskov Construction Technical School and became subordinate to the Department of Educational Institutions of Leningrad Regional Economic Soviet.

By the Resolution of the Regional Economic Soviet of the Leningrad Economic-Administrative Region No. 476-УК of 17.06.1958, Pskov Construction Technical School and Pskov Machine-Building Technical School were united into one Pskov Industrial Technical School, on the basis of Construction Technical School.

Pskov Industrial Technical School was renamed the state educational institution Pskov Industrial Technical School by the order of 24 January 1996 No. 2-204 / 9 of the State Committee of the Russian Federation for Defense Sectors of Industries.

The state educational institution Pskov Industrial Technical School was renamed into the state educational institution of secondary vocational education Pskov Industrial College by the order of the Ministry of Education of Russia of 28 July 1997 No. 1671.

In 2011, the Pskov Industrial Technical School was merged into the new Pskov SU.

Modern university 
Pskov SU has a multilevel system of higher education:

 Bachelor's degree (4 years or 5 years); 
 Specialist's degree (5 or 6 years); 
 Master's degree (2 years); 
 Postgraduate studies (3 or 4 years).

Pskov SU has 149 educational programs, including 76 Bachelor's degree training programs, 45 Master's degree training programs, 9 specialist's degree training programs, 19 training programs of scientific-pedagogical staff in postgraduate studies, 38 specialties of secondary vocational training, and also more than 100 programs of further education.

Pskov State University is included in the list of 13 educational organizations which are authorized to conduct an exam in Russian as a foreign language, Russian history, and fundamentals of legislation of the Russian Federation (Integration exam).

Pskov State University College in Pskov and Pskov State University branch in Velikiye Luki train middle-ranking specialists in secondary vocational education. Since 2013, the Faculty of Engineering and Economics has been opened at the branch of Pskov State University in Velikiye Luki, where training is carried out according to bachelor's degree programs.

The Institute of Life-Long Education successfully implements supplementary educational programs for children and adults, further education programs in the form of occupational retraining, advanced training, seminars, and masterclasses.

The recruitment for the medical field of study Medical care has been carried out since 2018.

In 2019, the university's educational activities were widely modernized, and new educational programs, technologies, and products were created and implemented.

• The basic professional educational program of the bachelor's degree in the field of study 18.03.02 of Energy and resource-saving processes in chemical technology, petrochemistry, and biotechnology has been developed together with the "anchor" resident of the Special economic zone of industrial and production type Moglino Titan-Polimer LLC;

• The basic professional educational program in the field of study of advertising and public relations, specialization Communication Technologies has been developed in cooperation with the National Research University Higher School of Economics and the Pskov Region Media Holding;

• Within the framework of the agreement with Peter the Great St. Petersburg Polytechnic University together with the National Research University Higher School of Economics, Master's program in the field of study 44.04.01 Pedagogical education, specialization Management of the Educational Process in the Modern School has been developed;

• New master's degree programs have been developed following the results of the program of advanced training and competitive selection conducted together with the Institute of Education of the National Research University Higher School of Economics: specialization Philology and Communicative Practices (field of study Philology); specialization Legal regulation of the digital economy (field of study Jurisprudence);

• Transition to modular educational programs: modules Formation of Civil and Cultural Identity, Formation of Key Digital Competences, Physical Culture, Sports and Health Saving, Module of Project Activity have been introduced;

• Elements of online learning have been introduced

• A model of continuous practice has been developed at the university. In the first iteration in 2019, 120 students of various fields of training practiced in the divisions of the Administration of the Pskov Region (Administration Apparatus, Departments and Divisions). A model of continuous practice for pedagogical training, as well as continuous practical training of students with the participation of residents of the Special Economic Zone Moglino and other organizations - representatives of basic industries of the region, which will be introduced in 2020, has been developed;

• A new concept of foreign language learning in non-linguistic directions of training has been formulated by establishing an initial and final level of foreign language proficiency, confirmed by an internationally recognized certificate.

Pskov State University systematically works with schoolchildren in the region. New forms of career guidance activities have been created for schoolchildren in the region for this purpose:

• The Kikoinskiy Class project together with Kurchatov Institute and School No. 1 of the city of Pskov. Since 1 September 2019, a pilot enrollment to the 5th grade has been made;

• Establishment of the Youth Engineering Center on the basis of Pskov Engineering and Linguistic Gymnasium with the participation of regional partners (Pskov Bakery Complex  JSC, Pskov Plant of Electrical Equipment ELTEH);

• Creation of the House of Scientific Collaboration on the basis of the university in 2021;

• Development of educational programs for the Center for Identification and Support of Gifted Children (Regional Sirius);

• Implementation of educational programs for IT-Cube in Pskov and development of educational programs for IT-Cube in Veliky Luki.

Structure 
The university has moved to a new academic structure, from 11 faculties to 6 multidisciplinary institutes created under the main directions of the development of educational programs, federal and regional requests. Partners for each institute have been identified and are working with them to develop joint educational programs. The new academic structure includes 6 institutes and 34 academic departments, the branch in the city of Velikiye Luki, Pskov State University College, Institute of Life Long Education, Center of the Russian Language and Culture named after E.A. Maimin, Resource training center of specialists for industry and the social sphere of the Pskov Region. [5]

Institutes and academic departments:

1)   Institute of Medicine and Experimental Biology (main partners ˗˗ Siberian State Medical University, North-West State Medical University named after I. I. Mechnikov, Federal State Budgetary Educational Institution National Medical Research Center named after V.A. Almazov) and Natural-geographical faculty (main partners Moscow State University, University of Tartu, Estonia):

Medical faculty:

• Department of Fundamental Medicine and Biochemistry

• Department of Medical Informatics and Cybernetics

• Department of Clinical Medicine

Natural-geographical faculty:

•  Department of Botany and Plant Ecology

• Department of Geography

• Department of Zoology and Animal Ecology

• Department of Chemistry

2) Institute of Mathematical Modeling and Game Practice (main partners ˗˗ Institute of Education of National Research University Higher School of Economics, Game practitioners Guild) :

• Department of Mathematics and Game Theory

• Department of Applied Informatics and Modeling

• Department of Physics

• Department of Design

3) Institute of Engineering Sciences (main partners ˗˗ Riga Technical University, Latvia, Peter the Great St. Petersburg Polytechnic University):

• Department of Engineering Technology and Techno sphere Safety

• Department of Electric Power, Electric Drive and Automation Systems

• Department of Architecture and Construction

• Department of Road Transport

• Department of Information and Communication Technologies

4 Institute of Humanities and Language Communication (main partners ˗˗ State Academic University for the Humanities, Institute for US and Canadian Studies of the Russian Academy of Sciences) and Faculty of the Russian Philology and Foreign Languages (main partners ˗˗ Daugavpils University, Latvia, University of Wroclaw, Poland) :

- Faculty of History

• Department of Russian History

• Department of World History and Regional Studies

• Department of Philosophy and Theology

- Faculty of the Russian Philology and Foreign Languages

• Department of Philology, Communication and Russian as a Foreign Language

• Department of European Languages and Cultures

• Department of Foreign Languages for Non-Linguistic Departments

5) Institute of Law, Economics and Management (main partners ˗˗ Peter the Great St. Petersburg Polytechnic University):

• Department of Economics, Finance and Financial Law

• Department of Management and Administrative Law

• Department of National Security and Human Rights

• Department of Civil Law and Procedure

• Department of Law Enforcement, Criminal Law and Procedure

• Department of State Law Disciplines and Theory of Law

6) Institute of Education and Social Sciences (main partner ˗˗ Herzen State Pedagogical University) :

• Department of Psychology and Child Development Support

• Department of Technology for Working with People with Special Needs

• Department of Health and Physical Development

• Department of Secondary General Education and Social Design

• Department of Theory and Methods of Preschool and Primary Education

• Laboratory of Technological Culture

Interfaculty Department of Physical Culture

Department of secondary vocational education of Pskov State University College

Department of secondary vocational education of Pskov State University branch in Velikiye Luki

Research 
Research work is currently becoming one of the absolute priorities in the functioning of Pskov State University. Scientific research in Pskov State University is carried out within 18 fields of study:

• Condensed Matter Physics

• Discrete Mathematics and Mathematical Cybernetics

• Zoology

• Ecology

• Energy

• Electrical Engineering

• Informatics, Computer Engineering and Management

• National History

• Archaeology

• Economics and National Economy Management

• Finance, Currency Circulation and Credit

• Philosophical Sciences

• Russian Literature

• Russian Language

• General Pedagogy, History of Pedagogy and Education

• Theory and Methodology of Training and Education

• Pedagogical Psychology

• Economic, Social, Political and Recreational geography

Currently, the main elements of the scientific and innovative infrastructure at Pskov State University are:

• Center of the Russian Language and Culture named after E. A. Maimin;

• 7 basic departments;                              

• 3 resource centers (scientific herbarium of Pskov State University; experimental laboratory of educational lexicography; resource center of the development of Pskov folk crafts);

• 16 scientific and educational centers;

• 6 small innovative enterprises (Delta-T ˗˗ in the field of electrical engineering, oil and gas production and composite materials; SOTA - in the field of information technology; Temp - in the field of vehicles; Levitron - in the field of electrical engineering and mechanical engineering; Energoconcept - in the field of energy and energy conservation; Integration - in the field of production of electrical equipment);

• business incubator Start in business;

• engineering center IETO.

The most important achievements of the university's Scientific Research Work are related to participation in programs and competitions conducted by the Ministry of Education and Science of the Russian Federation (Federal Target Program Scientific and Scientific-Pedagogical Personnel of Innovative Russia, Federal Target Program The Russian Language, Strategic Development Program of Pskov State University, State Assignment of the Ministry of Education and Science of the Russian Federation, Flagship Regional University Development Program), Russian Fundamental Scientific Foundation and Russian Humanitarian Scientific Foundation, in international projects, in administrative agreements, as well as with the provision of expert and consulting services.

A significant part of monographs, educational publications, sourcebooks of conferences and all scientific journals are published on the basis of the publishing house of Pskov State University.

In 2019, the modernization of the research and innovation activities of the university was carried out. Network research and educational laboratory were established with the involvement of a Russian or a foreign scientist from leading scientific organizations as a scientific adviser. Laboratories are mostly network-based / mirror-based, similar to laboratories that exist in an organization that provides scientific guidance. The following laboratories and research centers have also been established and upgraded:

• Integrated Environmental Research Laboratory (partner ˗˗ Moscow State University);

• Center of Comprehensive Regional Security Studies (partner ˗˗ Institute for US and Canadian Studies of the Russian Academy of Sciences);

• Engineering center Innovative Electrical Equipment (partner ˗˗ Peter the Great St. Petersburg Polytechnic University);

• Scientific Laboratory of Regional Philological Research (partner ˗˗ University of Wroclaw);

• Scientific Laboratory of Regional Economic Security (Peter the Great St. Petersburg Polytechnic University).

New interdisciplinary areas of research activity have appeared at Pskov State University: integrated environmental monitoring of water and other natural objects, comprehensive study of problems of regional economic security of border areas. Expansion of the number and topics of international grants within the framework of cross-border cooperation programs Russia - Latvia, Russia - Estonia, as well as Erasmus + programs, Jean-Monet module.

The university has established a council of young scientists focused on complex interdisciplinary research and increasing the productivity of scientific activities of young scientists.

All scientific journals (10 titles) published by PskovSU are registered with the ISSN International Center and included in the database of the Russian Science Citation Index. The scientific almanac "Metamorphosis of History" has an electronic version in addition to the printed version and is indexed in ERIH PLUS, ROAD, Index Copernicus and a number of other international databases, besides the Russian Scientific Citation Index.

The university is a co-founder of the scientific journal Pskov War-Historical Bulletin. [8]

In 2019, Pskov State University was one of the founders of the journal Russia and America in the 21st Century, published by the Institute for US and Canadian Studies of the Russian Academy of Sciences and the State Academic University for the Humanities.

At the beginning of 2018, Pskov State University was the copyright holder of 55 patents.

A significant number of scientific conferences are held annually on the basis of the university. According to the results of 2017, the university held 85 research-to-practice conferences. 39 of these conferences had an international or All-Russian level. [8]

Infrastructure 
Pskov State University has 13 educational and laboratory buildings with a total area of more than 28,5 thousand m2

Sports infrastructure of Pskov State University includes 9 gyms with a total area of  2,400 m2, an outdoor stadium and Universant swimming pool with a gym.

The bases of practice of Pskov State University are located in different districts of the Pskov region, each of which is characterized by a special flora, fauna or geological or historical-cultural peculiarities. They are located in the village Elizarovo, Pskovsky district, the village Krupp, Pechorsky district, village Stary Izborsk, Pechorsky district, village Pnevo, Gdovsky district, village Silovo-Medvedovo, Pskovsky district of the Pskov region.

All educational and laboratory buildings are equipped with food service areas.

Sports and health camp Iskra of Pskov State University is located near the village Opuhliki, Nevelsky district of the Pskov region. There are places for 100 students.

Medical and rehabilitation center with a university polyclinic is included in the infrastructure of Pskov State University. The Medical Rehabilitation Centre provides outpatient medical services to workers and students. It is included in compulsory health insurance.

The university has its own printing office with modern equipment. The printing office produces more than 450 units of scientific products per year with a general circulation of about 40,000 copies.

PskovSU has 3 assembly halls, including a separate building of the Center for Student Initiatives with a large conference hall.

A building for the new campus was purchased on the banks of  Velikaya River.

The library stock of Pskov State University has more than 900 thousand copies of printed publications of educational, methodical, scientific, reference and other literature necessary for library and information support of educational programs.

Users of PskovSU library have access to the IPRbooks Electronic Library System, the Electronic Library System of the publishing house Lan, the Electronic Library System Student Consultant, the Electronic Library System Urait and other databases, the bulletin of new revenues, virtual exhibitions, receive all necessary information about the activities and cultural and educational activities of PskovSU Library.

Activities 
In 2019, the Ministry of Science and Higher Education of the Russian Federation announced a competition for grants in the form of subsidies for the project Citizens Training in Life Long Education Programs in Educational Organizations Implementing Additional Educational Programs and Professional Training Programmes of the federal project New Opportunities for Everyone. Pskov State University submitted 7 additional professional advanced training programs to the competition and subsequently successfully implemented them: 4, 305 residents of the Pskov Region, as well as Novgorod and Leningrad Regions were trained for free.

The Ministry of Education of the Russian Federation conducted a competitive selection for the provision of grants from the federal budget in the form of subsidies for the implementation of measures aimed at the full functioning and development of the Russian language of the departmental special-purpose program Scientific, methodological and personnel support to the Russian language and languages of the peoples of the Russian Federation of the subprogramme Improvement of the management of the education system of the state program of the Russian Federation Development of Education. Within the framework of the project, the Center for Open Education in Russian and Teaching of the Russian Language named after knyaz Alexander Nevsky was established in Yuväskül, Finland, together with the non-profit organization Mosaiki. 25 students have already been trained in 2019.

Pskov State University won a grant from the federal budget during the competitive selection, which was organized by the Ministry of Education of the Russian Federation. The grant was provided for the implementation of the event Carrying out thematic shifts in seasonal camps for schoolchildren in the advanced fields of discrete mathematics, informatics, digital technology within the framework of the federal project Personnel for digital economy of the national program Digital economy of the state program Development of education.

Three projects of Pskov State University were supported in the competitive selection of the All-Russian Competition of Youth Projects among higher educational institutions based on the results of an expert evaluation: Student Asset School We are for Health, educational intensive Psychology and Family, an interregional festival of student creativity University of Stars.

Pskov State University has a close relationship with the city and the region. In particular, the Strategy of Social and Economic Development of the Pskov Region until 2030 and the Strategy of Development of the Municipal District of Pskov are being jointly developed.

Also, the Pskov region Administration and regional industrial partners are jointly developing a strategy for the development of Pskov State University with the allocation of basic industries (chemical industry, electrical industry, healthcare, tourism). The working groups include representatives of the Administration of the Pskov Region (Deputy Governor, chairmen and employees of the committees on economic development and investment policy, education, tourism, healthcare and representatives of the digital development and communication department), the real sector of the economy (the Special economic zone of industrial and production type Moglino, Pskov factory Titan-Polimer LLC, Electric Equipment Plant CJSC, Kontinent-tur LLC) and the university (acting rector, vice-rectors, directors of institutes and deans of faculties, heads of departments, scientists and teachers).

In 2019, the university became a part of the management structure of the special economic zone of industrial and production type Moglino (supervisory board).

Also, Pskov State University is a platform for public events. Thus, in 2019, 3 international and 1 regional events were held: International research-to-practice conference Northern Europe, Pskov and the Hanseatic Union in the past and present; the Second International research-to-practice conference dedicated to the 75th Anniversary of the Victory in the Great Patriotic War Without Limitation Periods; the Second International research-to-practice conference Borderless World: Russian as a foreign language in the international educational space vol. 2.0; The Second Pskov Mediaforum.

Student life 
Pskov State University has wide opportunities for realization of both creative potential (ensemble of folk instruments, folklore ensemble, choir chapel, 3 dance studios, 2 theatre studios and a vocal studio) and sports potential of students (15 sports sections).

The volunteer activity of the students is developed at Pskov State University. A regional volunteer center Volunteer Resource Center has been established on the basis of Pskov State University. The participants of the centre carry out their activities both at the university and abroad.

Students actively implement themselves in the field of public relations on the basis of student television Youth TV, Universants newspaper and newspapers created at some faculties.

In 2019 a student pedagogical team Nastavnik was created for training of counselors on the basis of the Pskov State University. The university also became one of the basic universities for the medical and diagnostic center Artek and the All-Russian Kid's Center Orlyonok.

There is the War-History Club at the university for those who are interested in history. Also, public associations of the Russian Geographical Society and Imperial Russian Historical Society have been established and operate on the basis of Pskov State University.

Cooperation 
Pskov State University is a member of a number of major international networks, including the University of the Arctic, the Baltic University Programs, the Partner Network of Universities of the Baltic Sea Region, the Hanseatic Economic Union and some others.

Pskov State University implements 6 international scientific and educational projects, as well as establishes partnerships with 77 universities from 22 countries and 15 Russian universities.

One of the important areas of cooperation between Pskov State University and foreign partners is conducting joint research and implementing scientific and educational projects. The projects are financed in the framework of international programs. The purpose of such projects is to attract financial resources to implement scientific ideas and promote research results at the international level.

Pskov State University is distinguished for its active work in the sphere of international activity. There are 1,300 foreign students from 41 countries of the world studying at Pskov State University. There is a wide network of tutors for the successful adaptation of foreign students and their involvement in university life.

Every year, the university develops exchange programs for short-term, medium-term and long-term traineeship. Pskov State University also implements international educational programs and double degree programs with foreign and Russian universities.

External links
https://www.pskgu.ru/page/dc0acae4-8c06-4b03-96e1-3e8068817c76
https://www.pskgu.ru/page/3e4f74e9-b4ea-4775-84c0-55186d09a6c1
https://pskgu.ru/page/b4970aef-7f63-4f33-94aa-3b5fcab7ce62

References 

Universities in Russia
Pskov
Technical universities and colleges in Russia